In graph theory, an -dimensional De Bruijn graph of  symbols is a directed graph representing overlaps between sequences of symbols. It has  vertices, consisting of all possible  sequences of the given symbols; the same symbol may appear multiple times in a sequence. For a set of  symbols  the set of vertices is:

If one of the vertices can be expressed as another vertex by shifting all its symbols by one place to the left and adding a new symbol at the end of this vertex, then the latter has a directed edge to the former vertex. Thus the set of arcs (that is, directed edges) is

Although De Bruijn graphs are named after Nicolaas Govert de Bruijn, they were discovered independently by both De Bruijn and I. J. Good. Much earlier, Camille Flye Sainte-Marie implicitly used their properties.

Properties 
 If , then the condition for any two vertices forming an edge holds vacuously, and hence all the vertices are connected, forming a total of  edges.
 Each vertex has exactly  incoming and  outgoing edges.
 Each -dimensional De Bruijn graph is the line digraph of the  De Bruijn graph with the same set of symbols.
 Each De Bruijn graph is Eulerian and Hamiltonian. The Euler cycles and Hamiltonian cycles of these graphs (equivalent to each other via the line graph construction) are De Bruijn sequences.

The line graph construction of the three smallest binary De Bruijn graphs is depicted below. As can be seen in the illustration, each vertex of the -dimensional De Bruijn graph corresponds to an edge of the  De Bruijn graph, and each edge in the -dimensional De Bruijn graph corresponds to a two-edge path in the  De Bruijn graph.

Dynamical systems 
Binary De Bruijn graphs can be drawn in such a way that they resemble objects from the theory of dynamical systems, such as the Lorenz attractor:

This analogy can be made rigorous: the -dimensional -symbol De Bruijn graph is a model of the Bernoulli map

The Bernoulli map (also called the  map for ) is an ergodic dynamical system, which can be understood to be a single shift of a -adic number. Equivalently, walks in the De Bruijn graph correspond to trajectories in a one-sided subshift of finite type.

Embeddings resembling this one can be used to show that the binary De Bruijn graphs have queue number 2 and that they have book thickness at most 5.

Uses 
 Some grid network topologies are De Bruijn graphs.
 The distributed hash table protocol Koorde uses a De Bruijn graph.
 In bioinformatics, De Bruijn graphs are used for de novo assembly of sequencing reads into a genome.

See also 
 De Bruijn torus
 Hamming graph
 Kautz graph

References

External links
 
 Tutorial on using De Bruijn Graphs in Bioinformatics by Homolog.us

Dynamical systems
Automata (computation)
Parametric families of graphs
Directed graphs